A Man on the Road (Spanish: Un hombre va por el camino) is a 1949 Spanish drama film directed by Manuel Mur Oti and starring Ana Mariscal, Fernando Nogueras and Pacita de Landa.

Cast
 Ana Mariscal as Julia  
 Fernando Nogueras as Luis Rodríguez  
 Pacita de Landa as Blanca  
 Julia Pachelo
 Matilde Artero 
 Manuel Guitián 
 Francisco Arenzana
 Enrique Ramirez
 Felisa Ortuondo 
 Aurelia Barceló 
 Marina Lorca

Awards

CEC Awards

References

External links 
 

1949 drama films
Spanish drama films
1949 films
1940s Spanish-language films
Films directed by Manuel Mur Oti
Films scored by Jesús García Leoz
Spanish black-and-white films
1940s Spanish films